The Socialist Equality Party (SEP) is a Trotskyist political party in the United States, one of several Socialist Equality parties around the world affiliated with the International Committee of the Fourth International (ICFI).  The ICFI publishes daily news articles, perspectives and commentaries on the World Socialist Web Site and maintains Mehring Books as publishing house.

The SEP was formed in 1995 by the Workers League, the US supporters of the ICFI. The Workers League had been founded in 1966 by the American Committee for the Fourth International (ACFI), headed by Tim Wohlforth, which emerged out of a split with the Socialist Workers Party, in opposition to the latter's support for Castroism.

According to the party's website, the SEP "seeks not to reform capitalism, but to create a socialist, democratic and egalitarian society through the establishment of a workers' government and the revolutionary transformation of the world economy. We seek to unify workers in the United States and internationally in the common struggle for socialism—that is, for equality and the rational and democratic utilization of the wealth of the planet."

In 2008, the SEP held its official founding congress, where it adopted a statement of principles and official organizational history. It has participated in elections in the United States, including running Jerry White for President and Niles Niemuth for Vice President in 2016, and Niemuth in Michigan's 12th congressional district in 2018.

History

Revolutionary Tendency 

In the early 1960s, most American Trotskyists were organized in the Socialist Workers Party (SWP) as part of the International Committee of the Fourth International (ICFI). Tim Wohlforth was a youth leader in that party and was opposed to the course of the organization, which was heading toward reunification with the International Secretariat of the Fourth International (ISFI).  With others, including James Robertson, he formed the Revolutionary Tendency (RT) within the SWP. It developed links with the Socialist Labour League in Britain, led by Gerry Healy.

They saw the course of the SWP towards a regrouping with the ISFI, which had long been called Pabloite by members of the ICFI as breaking with basic Trotskyist principles. The party leadership at the same time blocked discussion over other issues, such as the SWP's support for Fidel Castro as an "unconscious" Trotskyist.

The ICFI leadership, supported by the RT, argued that if a revolution can be carried out by an unconscious Trotskyist, there was no point of building the Fourth International as the conscious leadership of the working class.  The ICFI traced the SWP's support for Cuba to their "regroupment" policy, in which according to the ICFI they attempted to gain the support of the middle class radical supporters of Cuba. The ICFI claimed this was done without a genuine discussion of the principles of the Fourth International.

Reorganized Minority Tendency 
The two main leaders of the RT had different evaluations of the SWP. Robertson's position led the SWP to expel him and his supporters first, but he and his supporters did not join the ICFI. Robertson's group went on to form the Spartacist League. The remainder of the tendency, now led by Wohlforth alone, renamed their group the Reorganized Minority Tendency.

Wohlforth and a small handful of his supporters were themselves expelled early in September 1964, proclaiming themselves the American Committee for the Fourth International (ACFI) and launching the biweekly Bulletin of International Socialism. They maintained connections with Gerry Healy and the rest of the ICFI, which they considered the legitimate Trotskyist movement, becoming that group's American section.

Wohlforth and his co-thinkers claimed the split was due to their insistence on a discussion of the decision by the Sri Lankan Lanka Sama Samaja Party to participate in the national government. They characterized this decision as "opportunism" that originated in the "centrist" position of the LSSP during the split between the ISFI and ICFI of 1953.

Workers League 
The ACFI grew throughout the 1960s along with most leftist groupings. The ACFI was renamed the Workers League (WL) in 1966 and developed into a nationwide organization with hundreds of members. Its youth work, which led to the development of the Young Socialists, was particularly successful in this period.

In 1985, the ICFI split over policies advanced by the Workers Revolutionary Party in Britain. The policies they disagreed with included supporting national bourgeois regimes, including those of Saddam Hussein and Muammar Gadhafi; and supporting Gordon McLennan, General Secretary of the Communist Party of Great Britain. Many of Healy's former supporters saw these moves as a repetition of the mistakes of Pabloism.

The Workers League engaged in a long-term campaign against the rival Socialist Workers Party (SWP). In the 1970s, they issued a report titled "Security and the Fourth International" which alleged, amongst other things, that leading SWP member Joseph Hansen, who had been an assistant to Leon Trotsky during his Mexico City exile, was an accomplice in his assassination alleging that he and by implication the SWP were agents of the Soviet secret police (GPU). The WL also supported a lawsuit against the SWP by expelled member Alan Gelfand, who argued that he had been unconstitutionally deprived of his freedom of political expression by being expelled from the SWP by agents of the government. He attempted to force the government to reveal all its agents in the SWP and force the SWP to readmit him as a member. The lawsuit was dismissed in 1989, but not before confirming that former SWP leader Jim Cannon's secretary, Sylvia Callen (referred to by then-SWP national secretary Jack Barnes as his "hero"), had been a GPU agent.

The WL and its successor organization, the Socialist Equality Party, also countered the SWP's campaign in defense of Mark Curtis with its own campaign alleging that the SWP member was guilty of the sexual assault charge for which he was imprisoned.

Socialist Equality Party 

In 1995, the various parties affiliated with the ICFI renamed themselves the Socialist Equality Party. The ICFI launched the World Socialist Web Site in 1998. The party is also associated with the publishing house Mehring Books, formerly known as Labor Publications.

In 2006, the Socialist Equality Party relaunched its student movement (the Students for Social Equality) as the International Students for Social Equality, which was renamed the International Youth and Students for Social Equality (IYSSE) in 2012.

Ideology

The Obama administration 
The Socialist Equality Party claims that the majority of left-wing opponents of the Bush administration have "lined up behind the Obama Administration", despite the fact, they say, that the Obama administration's policies are in many respects similar to those of the Bush administration. The Socialist Equality Party seeks to create a mass movement in opposition to the Obama administration on the basis of a socialist program.

Workers' struggles and the trade unions 
Although some members of the Socialist Equality Party are union members and the party is committed to working within those organizations, it does not seek to facilitate any sort of social change through the trade unions, which they characterize as having interests antithetical to the workers they represent. The party calls for a break with the American union bureaucracies and the formation of "workplace committees" that will carry on economic struggles.

International revolution 
The Socialist Equality Party believes the revolution against capitalism is international in scope. Therefore, the strategy of the party flows from a consideration of the international conditions of the working class.

Class unity 
The Socialist Equality Party supports the unity of the working class and opposes "identity politics". According to the party, the "shift from class to identity has been at the expense of an understanding of the real causes, rooted in the capitalist system, of the hardships that confront all working people. At its worst, it has promoted a competition among different "identities" for access to educational institutions, jobs and other "opportunities" which, in a socialist society, would be freely available to all people without such demeaning, dehumanizing and arbitrary distinctions". The party opposes all forms of discrimination on any grounds and asserts that only a politically unified working class, composed of all races, religions and sexual orientations, can bring forth a free society.

Democratic rights 
The Socialist Equality Party believes democracy is a fundamental characteristic of the struggle for socialism and the party states: "Political equality is impossible without economic equality. Like the struggle against war, the fight to defend and expand democratic rights requires the independent political mobilization of the working class, on the basis of a socialist program, to conquer state power". Further, "it would favor the abolition of existing institutions that either curtail democratic processes or serve as centers of conspiracy against the people (such as the imperial Presidency, standing army, and national-security apparatus). These and other necessary changes of a profoundly democratic character, to be determined by the masses themselves, are possible only in the context of the mass mobilization of the working class, imbued with socialist consciousness".

Imperialism and war 
The Socialist Equality Party asserts that capitalism leads inevitably to war as imperialist states seek geo-political dominance, spheres of influence, markets, control of vital resources and access to cheap labor. Therefore, the party encourages and supports the widest mass protests against American militarism and its plans for war. The War on Terror is viewed as an assertion of imperial aggression on behalf of corporate interests and the party calls for an end to the conflicts in the Middle East.

Notable interventions

Massey coal mine explosion reports 
The Socialist Equality Party sent World Socialist Web Site reporters to West Virginia after the Massey Upper Big Branch Mine disaster, which occurred on April 5, 2010. According to one of the reports, Massey workers claimed that the company had refused to allow them time off so that they could attend the funerals of their co-workers. The World Socialist Web Site claimed that the article containing these interviews was "widely circulated and reposted or linked on the Internet".

Citizens Inquiry into the Dexter Avenue Fire 
In March 2010, the Socialist Equality Party initiated the Citizens Inquiry into the Dexter Avenue Fire in order to expose the life-threatening dangers caused by utility shutoffs after Sylvia Young, a single mother living on Dexter Avenue in Detroit, lost three of her children in a February fire several hours after DTE shut off her power and gas. The committee held a press conference on March 11, a hearing on March 20 and Fox 2 News did a television report. The inquiry conducted interviews with Young's sister and attendees of the hearing. The inquiry concluded with a report-back meeting on April 13, at which it announced its findings. The inquiry concluded that (1) "There is a direct and clearly established link between utility shutoffs and house fires"; (2) "The claim that there are resources widely available to help people pay their utility bills is untrue" and "the programs that exist are inadequate and designed to benefit DTE"; (3) "DTE's policies are determined not by community need, but by corporate and shareholder interests"; (4) "The city and state governments work on behalf of DTE and other corporations. Government officials have longstanding political and business ties to DTE"; (5) "Extreme poverty and mass unemployment are decisive factors in deadly house fires"; (6) "Sylvia Young, the mother of the three children killed in the Bangor Street fire, has been wrongly victimized"; and (7) "DTE Energy, its executives and regulating agencies bear primary responsibility for the deaths of Marvin Allen, Tyrone Allen, Lynn Greer, and the three Young children". The Citizens Inquiry also made a number of recommendations for solving the problems that it had uncovered.

Committee Against Utility Shutoffs 
In May 2010, workers and young people established the Committee Against Utility Shutoffs (CAUS) in response to the deadly house fires in Detroit, Michigan that were "the result of the shutoff of gas and electrical service by the local utility monopoly, DTE Energy".

Workers Inquiry Into the Bankruptcy of Detroit 
On October 4, 2013, the Socialist Equality Party organized a popular demonstration in Detroit to oppose the sale of artwork at the Detroit Institute of Arts and the dismantling of Detroit pensions. Both the sale and threats to pensions are associated with the Detroit bankruptcy. Hundreds of people attended the protest and attended the discussion panel afterwards. Members of the Defend the DIA campaign suggested an independent inquiry into the finances of the bankruptcy.

The Workers Inquiry findings were published at a full day forum at Wayne State University on February 15, 2014. The findings of the inquiry were separated into five sections: The Social and Historical Context of the Detroit Bankruptcy, The Political Conspiracy Behind the Bankruptcy of Detroit: Anatomy of a Crime, Art and the Working Class, The Detroit Bankruptcy: A Travesty of Democracy and The Rape of Detroit: Deindustrialization, Financialization and Parasitism.

Elections 
The Socialist Equality Party has also run candidates in several recent elections.

Presidential tickets

References

External links 
 Socialist Equality Party.
 World Socialist Web Site.
 The Bulletin. Marxists Internet Archive.
 

1966 establishments in the United States
Far-left politics in the United States
International Committee of the Fourth International
Non-interventionist parties
Political parties established in 1966
Communist parties in the United States
Trotskyist parties in the United States
Socialist parties in the United States
Political parties in the United States